Kyle Craig Bolerjack (born May 16, 1958) is an American sportscaster.  He is currently calling Utah Jazz telecasts on AT&T SportsNet Rocky Mountain with Thurl Bailey. He also calls games for CBS, ESPN, and CBS College Sports Network in a national broadcasting career that dates back to the late 1990s.

Biography
Born in Willow Springs, Missouri, Bolerjack graduated from Shawnee Mission Northwest High School in Shawnee Mission, Kansas. He enrolled at Kansas State University and walked on to the Kansas State Wildcats football team as a linebacker, but left the team after fall camp due to an ACL injury. While attending college, he worked as sports director for the campus radio station KSDB. Bolerjack is also an alumni member of Delta Upsilon Kansas State chapter. He began his television broadcast career as a weekend sports anchor for KTSB-TV Topeka (now KSNT) before moving to Salt Lake City, Utah to work as sports anchor at KSL-TV, which included play-by-play announcing of BYU football and basketball broadcasts on the network.

He and Steve Beuerlein were the secondary college football broadcast team for CBS Sports. They were on the air when two games were scheduled on the network on the same day. He also was a reserve broadcaster for the NFL on CBS. In 2006, Bolerjack filled in for Bill Macatee, who was on assignment for PGA Tour Merrill Lynch Shootout, on the Houston Texans-Jacksonville Jaguars matchup with Rich Baldinger. And, in 2007, he filled in for Greg Gumbel, who was filling in for an ill James Brown, on the Cleveland Browns-Arizona Cardinals matchup with Dan Dierdorf. He also worked with Todd Blackledge, Mike Mayock, and FOX colleague Daryl Johnston.

Bolerjack had also called games in the NCAA basketball tournament since 2000. During the 2001 tournament, he called the four first-round games in Boise, Idaho, where all of them were decided by three points or fewer, including 15-seed Hampton's upset of second-seeded Iowa State.

Bolerjack called Pac-12 games on Fox Sports Net with Joel Klatt and Petros Papadakis in 2011 and continues to perform the same role for FX and Fox College Football, along with CBS and Fox colleague Gus Johnson. In 2011, Bolerjack filled in for Stockton in the NFL on Fox TV broadcast booth for the week 4 matchup between the Atlanta Falcons and Seattle Seahawks with John Lynch.

In addition to his other work, Bolerjack is the voice of the Utah Jazz. He replaced "Hot Rod" Hundley on the television broadcasts during the 2005–06 NBA season. (Hundley continued to announce on the radio, but announced his retirement after the 2008–09 NBA season.) His on-air partner, Matt Harpring, is former Utah Jazzman. Harpring began doing the TV broadcasts starting with the season (2010–2011), when Ron Boone moved over to the radio broadcasts. He was also the preseason voice of the Miami Dolphins until he was replaced by Dick Stockton.

Bolerjack lives in Sandy, Utah with his wife, Sharon, and his three children.

References

1958 births
Living people
American television sports announcers
Arena football announcers
College basketball announcers in the United States
College football announcers
Kansas State University alumni
Miami Dolphins announcers
National Football League announcers
People from Johnson County, Kansas
People from Sandy, Utah
People from Willow Springs, Missouri
Sportspeople from Missouri
Utah Jazz announcers
Major Indoor Soccer League (1978–1992) commentators